Kalumpang is a mukim in Hulu Selangor District, Selangor, Malaysia.

References

Hulu Selangor District
Mukims of Selangor